A. J. Cooper is an American football coach.

A. J. Cooper may also refer to:

Anna J. Cooper  (1858–1964), American author, educator, sociologist
A. J. Cooper, a fictional casino owner in Las Vegas (TV series)#A.J. Cooper (season 5)